

Executive

Governors of Ohio and Candidates

Lieutenant Governors of Ohio and Candidates

Attorneys General of Ohio and Candidates

State Auditors of Ohio and Candidates

Secretaries of State of Ohio and Candidates

State Treasurers of Ohio and Candidates

Legislative

Ohio State Senators and Candidates

Majority Leaders of the Ohio Senate

Minority Leaders of the Ohio Senate

Majority Whips of the Ohio Senate
Steve Austria, Republican, Senate District 10, Since 2005

Minority Whips of the Ohio Senate

Ohio State Representatives and Candidates

Majority Leaders of the Ohio House of Representatives

Minority Leaders of the Ohio House of Representatives

Majority Whips of the Ohio House of Representatives

Minority Whips of the Ohio House of Representatives

Judicial

Chief Justices of the Ohio Supreme Court and Candidates
(the office of chief justice was created in 1912)

Associate Justices of the Ohio Supreme Court and Candidates

Judges of Ohio Courts of Appeal and Candidates

See also
List of presidents of the Ohio Senate
List of speakers of the Ohio House of Representatives

Lists of Ohio politicians